Stadionul Cristinel Răducan is a multi-purpose stadium in Târgu Cărbunești, Romania. It is currently used mostly for football matches, is the home ground of Gilortul Târgu Cărbunești and has a capacity of 1,000 seats.

References

External links
Stadionul Cristinel Răducan at soccerway.com

Football venues in Romania
Sport in Gorj County
Buildings and structures in Gorj County